Thala gorii is a species of small sea snail, marine gastropod mollusk in the family Costellariidae, the ribbed miters.

Description
The length of the shell attains 6 mm.

Distribution
This marine species occurs off the Maldives.

References

 Gori, S.; Rosado, J.; Salisbury, R. A. (2019). Costellariidae (Gastropoda) from Dhofar, Oman with descriptions of eight new species and notes on Vexillum appelii (Jickeli, 1874). Acta Conchyliorum. 18: 25-48.

Costellariidae
Gastropods described in 2003